Champion Band is a gospel rock band from Central Ohio. The band was formally founded in 2009 by five members of Amante Lacey and the Life Worship Band, a group formed in 2003. Members are Amante Lacey, Donnell Phillips, Chriss Triplett, Matt Goodloe, and Donnie Reis. Amante Lacey and the Life Worship Band released an EP titled, Champion, in 2008. It was well received by fans and the five core members knew they had something special. This led them to formally create Champion Band. The group toured North American, and gained much success in the Midwest, New York, and Canada. In 2009, they recorded an album in front of a live audience at Greater Grace Temple in Springfield, OH. The album was produced by the five members of Champion at Twelve 3 South Studio in Tipp City, OH, owned by member, Donnie Reis.  Their debut LP, Champion Live, was released August 19, 2010.

Songs from the album, Champion Live, were subsequently licensed to recording artists, Byron Cage and Tye Tribbett, appeared on multiple albums and ranked on several Billboard Charts.

 Tye Tribbett’s album, Fresh, released 10/15/2010 features the song "Champion" with string orchestrations composed and played by Donnie Reis. Billboard’s Top Gospel Album, #1, Billboard’s Top 200, #60, Gospel Digital Song #23.
 Byron Cage's album, Memoirs of a Worshipper, features the song "Great and Mighty," released 6/19/2012. Billboard’s Hot Gospel Songs #8, Gospel Airplay #8, Top Gospel Album #3, Christian/Gospel Album #5, Billboard’s Top 200, #155.
 WOW Gospel 2013, released 1/29/2013, features the song "Great and Mighty," by Byron Cage. Billboard’s Top Gospel Album, #1, Christian/Gospel Albums, #2, Compilation Albums, #3, Top Album Sales, #43.

The band recorded a second album in 2011, which was never released publicly following an accident that left band member, Chriss Triplett, paralyzed. The group played a few pre-booked shows with a substitute drummer, and then took a break during Chriss' recovery. The album would be the last that Chriss would record. Members say it's an acoustic album, featuring several of their top hit songs. Member, Donnie Reis, reports a release of this record is planned for 2020, along with a 10th Anniversary re-mastered release of "Champion Live."

Members 
Amante Lacey (lead vocals, guitar, producer, author/composer)
Donnie Reis (violin, viola, string orchestrations, producer, composer)
Matt Goodloe (bass guitar, producer, composer)
Donnell Phillips (keys, producer, composer)
Chriss Triplett (drums, producer, composer)

Discography 
 Champion Live, August 19, 2010

References 

American gospel musical groups
Musical groups from Ohio